Stefan Šorak (born 26 March 1992) is a Serbian swimmer. He competed in the men's 200 metre individual medley event at the 2017 World Aquatics Championships.

References

1992 births
Living people
Serbian male swimmers
Place of birth missing (living people)
Swimmers at the 2010 Summer Youth Olympics
Swimmers at the 2013 Mediterranean Games
Male medley swimmers
Mediterranean Games competitors for Serbia
21st-century Serbian people